Oston Rustam oʻgʻli Urunov (born 19 December 2000) is an Uzbekistani footballer who plays as an attacking midfielder for Navbahor Namangan and the Uzbekistan national football team.

Career

Club
Oston Urunov played in Uzbekistan for Navbahor and PFC Lokomotiv Tashkent. In total, he played 55 matches in the Uzbekistan Super League.

On 10 February 2020, Urunov signed a long-term contract with Russian Premier League club Ufa. On 5 August 2020, Spartak Moscow announced the signing of Urunov to a long-term contract from Ufa. On 20 February 2021, he returned to Ufa on loan with an option to purchase.

Upon his return from loan at Ufa, he was moved by Spartak to their second squad in the Russian Football National League, FC Spartak-2 Moscow.

On 19 August 2021, he returned to Ufa on another season-long loan, with an option to purchase. 

On 2 September 2022, Urunov's contract with Spartak was terminated by mutual consent. On the same day, Urunov signed with Ural Yekaterinburg. On 25 October 2022, Ural terminated contract with Urunov by mutual consent.

International
Urunov made his professional debut for the Uzbekistan national football team in a friendly 2–0 loss to Turkey on 2 June 2019.

Career statistics

Club

International

References

External links

2000 births
Living people
People from Navoiy Region
Uzbekistani footballers
Uzbekistan international footballers
Association football midfielders
Uzbekistan Super League players
Pakhtakor Tashkent FK players
Navbahor Namangan players
PFC Lokomotiv Tashkent players
FC Ufa players
FC Spartak Moscow players
FC Spartak-2 Moscow players
FC Ural Yekaterinburg players
Uzbekistani expatriate footballers
Expatriate footballers in Russia
Russian Premier League players